The 1955–56 FA Cup  was the 75th staging of the world's oldest football cup competition, the FA Cup. Manchester City won the competition, beating Birmingham City 3–1 in the final at Wembley, London.

Matches were scheduled to be played at the stadium of the team named first on the date specified for each round, which was always a Saturday. If scores were level after 90 minutes had been played, a replay would take place at the stadium of the second-named team later the same week. If the replayed match was drawn further replays would be held at neutral venues until a winner was determined. If scores were level after 90 minutes had been played in a replay, a 30-minute period of extra time would be played.

Calendar

Results

First Round Proper

At this stage the 48 Third Division North and Third Division South clubs joined the 30 non-league clubs who came through the qualifying rounds plus Bishop Auckland and Hendon were given byes to this round.

The matches were played on Saturday, 19 November 1955. Seven matches were drawn, with replays taking place later that week. Two ties needed a second replay, which took place on the following Monday, 28 November 1955.

Second Round Proper 
The matches were played on Saturday, 10 December 1955. Seven matches were drawn, with replays taking place later that week.

Third Round Proper
This round was the first in which the 44 Second Division and First Division (top-flight) teams entered the competition. The matches were scheduled to be played on Saturday, 7 January 1956, though four were postponed until later that week because of bad weather. Four matches were drawn, with replays taking place later that week.

Fourth Round Proper
The matches were played on Saturday, 28 January 1956. Four matches were drawn, three of which were settled in a single replay. The fourth, between Burnley and Chelsea, was eventually decided in Chelsea's favour in the fourth replay, played 18 days after the date of the original tie.

Fifth Round Proper
The matches were played on Saturday, 18 February 1956. Three matches were drawn, with replays taking place later that week.

Final rounds

Sixth Round Proper

Replay

Semi-finals

Final

The final took place on Saturday, 5 May 1956 at Wembley and ended 3–1, with goals scored by Joe Hayes, Bobby Johnstone and Jack Dyson for Manchester City and Noel Kinsey for Birmingham City. The attendance was 100,000. The match is remembered for an incident where Manchester City goalkeeper Bert Trautmann sustained a neck injury diving at the feet of Birmingham attacker Peter Murphy; he completed the game in considerable pain, and later examination discovered he had broken a bone in his neck.

References
The FA Cup Archive at TheFA.com
Results on Soccerbase

Notes

 
FA Cup seasons